

Shangruti is a mountain peak located  on the Pakistani side of the Line of Control in Kharmang District, Gilgit-Baltistan, Pakistan.

The east–west-running watershed ridge next to Shangruti, referred to as the Shangruti ridge, serves as the de facto border between Pakistan-administered Baltistan and Indian-administered Ladakh.

Maps

See also
 Ganokh
 Aryan Valley
 Yaldor Sub Sector
 List of mountains in Pakistan

References

External links
 Aerial view of Shantruti overlooking Batalik, Google maps. Retrieved 29 November 2019.

Mountains of Gilgit-Baltistan
Skardu District